USA-198, known before launch as NRO Launch 24 (NROL-24), is an American communications satellite that was launched in 2007.

Launch 
United Launch Alliance (ULA) performed the launch of USA-198 using an Atlas V rocket in the 401 configuration from SLC-41 of the Cape Canaveral Space Force Station at 22:05 UTC on December 10, 2007.

References 

Spacecraft launched in 2007
Spacecraft launched by Atlas rockets
Satellites of the United States